Music While You Work was a daytime radio programme of continuous live popular music broadcast in the United Kingdom twice daily on workdays from 23 June 1940  until 29 September 1967 by the BBC. Initially, the morning edition was generally broadcast on the BBC Home Service at 10:30am, with the afternoon edition at 3pm on the Forces/General Forces Programme - and after the war on the BBC Light Programme. Between August 1942 and July 1945, a third edition was broadcast at 10:30pm for night-shift workers.

The programme began in World War II with the idea that playing non-stop popular/light music at an even tempo would help factory workers become more productive.

The programme originally consisted of live music (light orchestras, dance bands, brass and military bands and small instrumental ensembles). In order to make studios more available during the day, it was decided in 1963 that the shows would be pre-recorded (often in the evening or on Sundays). The programme began and ended with its theme tune, "Calling All Workers" by Eric Coates. Many combinations made hundreds of appearances, notably Troise and his Banjoliers, George Scott-Wood and His Music, Cecil Norman and the Rhythm Players, Bernard Monshin and his Rio Tango Band, Anton and his Orchestra, Bill Savill and his Orchestra and Jack White and his Band.

Although the programme became very popular with domestic audiences and later with motorists, it was aimed first and foremost at the factories, and strict rules were applied: predominantly familiar pieces, nothing lethargic, consistent volume, avoidance of overloud drumming (which could sound like gunfire), and generally cheerful programmes to which workers could whistle or sing. Jazz was discouraged as, by its very nature, it often deviates from the melody, which had to be clear at all times. The song "Deep in the Heart of Texas" was banned from the show, because of the potential danger of production line workers taking their hands away from their work or banging their spanners on the machinery to perform the four hand-claps in the chorus.

Music While You Work ended in 1967 when the BBC Light Programme transformed into BBC Radio 2. It was revived for a week to mark the BBC's 60th anniversary in October 1982 and then as a regular part of Radio 2 from January 1983 to January 1984. There were two short revivals in 1990 and 1991, and a final one-off programme in 1995. The concept of the programme was evoked during BBC Radio 3's "Light Fantastic" 2011 season with a live broadcast of light music from a factory in Irlam performed by the BBC Philharmonic, reminiscent of Music While You Work and Workers' Playtime. This one-off programme differed from the original series as it was staged before an audience and the items were announced.

A radio documentary on the programme, The Music Factory, was first broadcast in September 2002. From 2000, Serenade Radio began broadcasting historic reruns of the programme at 9.30am on weekdays.

See also 
 Workers' Playtime

Footnotes

External links
 Audio clip from BBC archives
 Masters of Melody website

BBC Light Programme programmes
1940 radio programme debuts
1967 radio programme endings
British classical music radio programmes
British jazz radio programs
BBC Home Service programmes